The International Association for the Study of Child Language (IASCL) is an academic society for first language acquisition researchers. 

IASCL was founded in 1970 by a group of prominent language acquisition researchers to promote international and interdisciplinary cooperation in the study of child language. Its major activity is the sponsorship of the triennial International Congress for the Study of Child Language, for which it publishes proceedings.  It also publishes the Child Language Bulletin approximately twice a year. 

At its triennial meeting, IASCL honors a researcher who has made outstanding contributions to the international child language community with the Roger Brown Award. Previous recipients are Brian MacWhinney (2011), Dan Slobin (2014), Jean Berko Gleason (2017), and Eve V. Clark (2020/2021).

Past presidents of IASCL include Walburga von Raffler-Engel (founding president), Catherine E. Snow, Ruth A. Berman, Michael Tomasello, and Elena Lieven.

Publications
Journal of Child Language
First Language
Child Language Bulletin
Trends in Language Acquisition Research (TiLAR)

References

External links 

 Official website

Psychology organizations
Linguistics organizations
Linguistic research institutes
Language acquisition
Psycholinguistics
Developmental psychology
Speech and language pathology